Cenesthopathy (from , formed from the Ancient Greek  "common",  "feeling", "perception" +  "feeling, suffering, condition"), also known as coenesthesiopathy, is a rare psychiatric term used to refer to the feeling of being ill and this feeling is not localized to one region of the body. Most notably, cenesthopathies are characterized by aberrant and strange bodily sensations (for example, a feeling of wires or coils being present within the oral region; tightening, burning, pressure, tickling etc. occurring in various parts of the body, and so on).

Classification of cenesthopathies

Cenesthopathic schizophrenia 
The established occurrence of coenesthetic hallucinations in 18% of individuals with a psychiatric diagnosis of schizophrenia has led to the formulation of a separate subgroup of schizophrenia in the ICD-10, called cenesthopathic schizophrenia. Cenesthopathic schizophrenia is included (but not defined) within the category "other schizophrenia" in the 10th revision of the International Statistical Classification of Diseases and Related Health Problems.

History 
Cenesthopathy (originally ) is a term created in 1907 by the French neuro-psychiatrists Ernest Ferdinand Pierre Louis Dupré and Paul Camus.

References 

 Notes

 Sources

Symptoms and signs of mental disorders